Wayne Vaz (born 28 July 1994) is an Indian professional footballer who plays as a defender for Mohammedan in the I-League.

Career

Chennai City
Wayne Vaz was hired by I-League debutant Chennai City F.C. for 2016–17 season.

Pune City
On 23 July 2017, FC Pune City opted for Vaz as their ninth draft pick in 2017–18 ISL Players Draft.

Churchill Brothers
After signing for FC Pune City the defender went on loan to Churchill Brothers back to back for I-league season 2017–18 and 2018–19.

NorthEast United FC
On 3 June 2019, Vaz signed for ISL side NorthEast United FC.

Career statistics

Club

Honours
Mohammedan Sporting
I-League: 2021–22

References

FC Pune City players
NorthEast United FC players
I-League players
Indian Super League players
Living people
Association football defenders
1994 births
Indian footballers
Chennai City FC players
Churchill Brothers FC Goa players
Footballers from Mumbai
Mohammedan SC (Kolkata) players